Oncideres impluviata is a species of beetle in the family Cerambycidae. It was described by Ernst Friedrich Germar in 1842. It is known from Brazil, Argentina, Uruguay, and Paraguay. It feeds on Parapiptadenia rigida.

References

impluviata
Beetles described in 1842